Michael Jay Williams (born 16 October 1929), son of Louis Jay Williams and brother of Ronald Jay Williams, is a Trinidad and Tobago politician and businessman.

Williams attended Queen's University, Kingston, Ontario, Canada, to study engineering. He was appointed to the Senate of Trinidad and Tobago by A. N. R. Robinson following the National Alliance for Reconstruction victory in the 1986 General Elections. Williams served as President of the Senate between 1986 and 1990. He was married to Teresa Anna Tang and had 11 children, five male and six female.

References

Presidents of the Senate (Trinidad and Tobago)
Trinidad and Tobago people of Chinese descent
Living people
1929 births
Queen's University at Kingston alumni
National Alliance for Reconstruction politicians